New Zealand Winegrowers is the national industry body that represents New Zealand's viticulture and winemaking sectors. It conducts research, promotion, marketing and advocacy in the interests of New Zealand grape growers and winemakers, both domestically and in international export markets. Winemakers and grape growers are automatically entitled to membership of New Zealand Winegrowers through payment of the levies on grape or wine sales required by law in the Commodity Levies Act 1991 and the Wine Act 2003. This combined with New Zealand's small size means that it is the only country in the world with a single national wine industry body.

History 
In the early 2000s significant overlaps in mandate and operations were identified in two former national organisations: the Wine Institute of New Zealand, established in 1975, and the New Zealand Grape Growers Council. These organisations were merged in 2002 to become a single organisation, New Zealand Winegrowers, which was finally incorporated in 2016. New Zealand Winegrowers in its 2017 annual report set a target of $2 billion NZD of export revenue by 2020.

See also 
New Zealand wine

External links 
New Zealand Winegrowers official website

References 

2002 establishments in New Zealand
1975 establishments in New Zealand
New Zealand wine
Wine industry organizations
Business organisations based in New Zealand
Alcohol industry trade associations